The 1968 La Flèche Wallonne was the 32nd edition of La Flèche Wallonne cycle race and was held on 21 April 1968. The race started in Liège and finished in Marcinelle. The race was won by Rik Van Looy of the Willem II–Gazelle team.

General classification

References

1968 in road cycling
1968
1968 in Belgian sport
1968 Super Prestige Pernod